Dana Sprengers (born 28 July 1990) is a Dutch female BMX rider, representing her nation at international competitions. She competed in the time trial event and race event at the 2015 UCI BMX World Championships.

References

External links
 
 

1990 births
Living people
BMX riders
Dutch female cyclists
People from Bergeijk
Cyclists from North Brabant
21st-century Dutch women